The Robert C. Beauchamp House is a historic house in Hancock County, Kentucky, located  west or northwest of Hawesville on U.S. Route 60.

Its significance:The house was built in 1842 by Robert Costain Beauchamp (1800-1884), a highly successful gentleman farmer and businessman. He was one of the first men to introduce the plantation system with a large work force of slaves, to Western Kentucky. He was also active in state and local politics. The amply-proportioned brick house is one of the oldest in Hancock County, Kentucky.

It was listed on the National Register of Historic Places in 1976.

References

Houses on the National Register of Historic Places in Kentucky
Georgian architecture in Kentucky
Houses completed in 1842
1842 establishments in Kentucky
National Register of Historic Places in Hancock County, Kentucky